Biefvillers-lès-Bapaume is a commune in the Pas-de-Calais department in the Hauts-de-France region in northern France.

Geography
Biefvillers-lès-Bapaume is a small farming village located just outside Bapaume and 12 miles (19 km) south of Arras.
It was within the theatre of operations of the Battle of Bapaume, during the Franco-Prussian War.

Population

Sights
 The church of St. Vaast, rebuilt, as was much of the village, after the ravages of World War I.

See also
Communes of the Pas-de-Calais department

References

Communes of Pas-de-Calais